The COVID-19 pandemic has impacted and affected the political system of Malaysia, causing suspensions of legislative activities and isolation of multiple politicians due to fears of spreading the virus. The onset of the pandemic coincided with a political crisis in early 2020 which continued into 2021 as the spread of COVID-19 and emergency government measures exacerbated initially unrelated political instability, culminating in the resignation of Prime Minister Muhyiddin Yassin and his cabinet in August 2021. Numerous elections have been postponed or suspended, after the 2020 Sabah state election was blamed for a major outbreak in the state that led to the country's third wave. Several politicians have tested positive for COVID-19 in 2020 and 2021.

General election and government formation

A political crisis in Malaysia coincided with the onset of the COVID-19 pandemic in the country. The Pakatan Harapan coalition government collapsed, leading to the resignation of Prime Minister Mahathir Mohamad and eventual replacement with Muhyiddin Yassin and a new Perikatan Nasional coalition, which maintained a small majority. Prime Minister Muhyiddin blamed the 2020 Sabah state election for a substantial increase in COVID-19 cases across the state and country.

In June 2021, the rulers of Malaysia declared that there is no need to extend a state of emergency after 1 August, and parliament should be reopen as soon as possible.

Restriction announcements
A large outbreak at a Tablighi Jamaat religious event and spread of the virus across the country thought to have been exacerbated by the political instability, which newly appointed Health Minister Adham Baba used to criticize his predecessor Dzulkefly Ahmad, despite the absence of a clear government responsible at the time of the event. Shortly after a thin government majority was established, the new government announced the nationwide Movement Control Order (MCO) to curb the spread of the virus.

Amid ongoing political instability, Yang di-Pertuan Agong warned politicians in May 2020 that he "would like to advise against dragging the country once again into a political mess that brings uncertainties" given the ongoing health crisis in the country.
In January 2021, a State of Emergency was declared, suspending all elections and parliament, and the government were empowered to pass laws without oversight in response to the pandemic and ongoing political instability. This led to the resignation of MP Ahmad Jazlan Yaakub from the party, resulting in the loss of the government's required majority of at least 111 MPs in the Dewan Rakyat. Opposition leader Anwar Ibrahim criticised the declaration, saying this was an effort for the government to maintain power and that 115 other MPs were against it.

Instances of isolation and testing

On 17 March 2020, Kelvin Yii Lee Wuen ( member of parliament) tested positive for COVID-19 and was quarantined at Sarawak General Hospital. He was suspected of having been infected with the virus after meeting Sarikei MP Wong Ling Biu who was also tested positive for the virus. He was announced to have recovered on 23 March 2020. Another MP which is Chong Chieng Jen ( member of parliament) tested negative.

List of assemblymen who tested positive for COVID-19

Dewan Negara (Senators) 
Dewan Negara

Dewan Rakyat (Members of Parliament) 
Dewan Rakyat

Dewan Undangan Negeri (Malaysian State Assembly Representatives) 

State legislative assemblies of Malaysia

Selangor State Legislative Assembly

Sabah State Legislative Assembly

Johor State Legislative Assembly

Kelantan State Legislative Assembly

Pahang State Legislative Assembly

Perlis State Legislative Assembly

Malacca State Legislative Assembly

Terengganu State Legislative Assembly

Kedah State Legislative Assembly

Negeri Sembilan State Legislative Assembly

Sarawak State Legislative Assembly

See also
 2020–21 Malaysian political crisis
 2021 Malaysian state of emergency
 Issues related to the COVID-19 pandemic in Malaysia
 Social impact of the COVID-19 pandemic in Malaysia
 Political impact of the COVID-19 pandemic

References

Politics of Malaysia
2020 in Malaysia
2021 in Malaysia
Ireland
Politics